Hobart, also known as The Pennsy Depot, is a disused train station in Hobart, Indiana. It was built in 1911 and listed on the National Register of Historic Places in 1984 as the Pennsylvania Railroad Station.

The first railroad to reach Hobart in 1858 was the Pittsburgh, Fort Wayne and Chicago Railway (PFW&C) which later became part of the Pennsylvania Railroad. This was followed by the New York, Chicago & St. Louis (NYC&StL) or ‘Nickel Plate’ in 1882. The Elgin, Joliet and Eastern Railway (EJ&E) crossed both of these line in Hobart in 1888. The EJ&E maintained crossing towers at each crossing. The ‘Ho Tower” was at the Nickel Plate Crossing on the south side and the ‘Bart Tower” at the PFW&C crossing on the east side of town.

The first PFW&C depot was made of wood in 1858 and burned down. The second depot was removed in 1911 to make way for the 3rd Street – Highway 51 crossing and the new brick ‘Pennsy Depot’ constructed.

The station was designed by Price & McDanahan in a Colonial Revival style using the local pressed brick.  Its outstanding features include the gabled porticoes, curved soffits, ceramic-tile inserts and the semicircular transom windows. It was closed when passenger service ended to Hobart. The ‘Save Our Station Committee of the Hobart Historical Society  obtained ownership in 1983. It was transferred to the City of Hobart in 2004. 
It was a craft shop for several years.  In July 2010, the Hobart Chamber of Commerce was using the building for offices.

Bibliography

 Clippings and photo files

References

External links

National Register of Historic Places in Lake County, Indiana
Former Pennsylvania Railroad stations
Railway stations on the National Register of Historic Places in Indiana
Railway stations in Lake County, Indiana
Railway stations in the United States opened in 1911
Former Amtrak stations in Indiana
Railway stations closed in 1991